The Copa Betico Croes (English: Betico Croes Cup) known as Torneo Copa Betico Croes, or simply Copa Betico is the top knockout tournament of the Aruban football teams organized by the Aruba Football Federation.

Finals

Winners

References

External links
Aruba - List of Cup Winners, RSSSF.com
Copa Betico Croes, Soccerway.com
Official website, AVB 
Copa Betico Croes, Futbolaruba.com

Football competitions in Aruba
National association football cups